Attached to the posterior border of the hard palate is a thin, firm, fibrous lamella called the palatine aponeurosis, which supports the muscles and gives strength to the soft palate.

It is thicker above and narrows on the way down where it becomes very thin and difficult to define.

Laterally, it is continuous with the pharyngeal aponeurosis.

It serves as the insertion for the tensor veli palatini and levator veli palatini, and the origin for the musculus uvulae, palatopharyngeus, and palatoglossus.

It provides support for the soft palate.

See also
 Aponeurosis

References

Human head and neck